Edward Fenwick Zuber (born 1932) is a Canadian artist.

Early life
Zuber was born in 1932 in Montreal, Quebec. He first studied art at the École des Beaux-Arts de Montréal, attended Queen's University (fine arts). He served an apprenticeship with Matthew Martirano.

Military service in Korea 
At the outbreak of the Korean War in 1950, Zuber enlisted.  He was  a parachutist with the 1st Battalion, The Royal Canadian Regiment. He traveled with his battalion's to Korea in 1952; and he was wounded in action. and was evacuated to the Norwegian M.A.S.H. and the 25th Canadian Field Hospital.

Throughout his experience on the Korean front, Zuber produced many drawings and maintained a detailed "Sketch diary". Paintings created after his return to Canada are informed by Zuber's frontline notebooks and experiences.  Thirteen of these canvases are in the collections of the Canadian War Museum.

During the Korean War, no official war artist was designated by Canada's military.

War artist 
When the Gulf War began, the experience of Canadian forces during "Operation Friction" was captured by the Canadian Armed Forces Civilian Artists Program (CAFCAP). Zuber was selected from among a field of other applicants; and during his time in Qatar, he was recognized as an "official war artist."

Zuber served in the Gulf War Theatre from 21 January to 3 March 1991 as Canada's Official War Artist.

Honors
Zuber is the only Canadian service man or woman to have both the Korean War medal and the Gulf War medal. 
 November 11, 1991 — awarded the Korean Medal along with the other Canadians who served in Korea.
 December 17, 1991 — awarded the Kuwait and Gulf medal by Chief of the Defense Staff, General John de Chastelain.

See also
 Canadian official war artists
 War artist
 War art

Notes

References
 Bjarnason, Dan and Lani Selick. "North Korea: The Forgotten War," CBC News (Canadian Broadcasting Company). July 18, 2003.

External links
 Zuber Collection on Civilization.ca
 Ted Zuber's web site
 Edward Zuber on veterans.gc.ca
 
1932 births 
Living people 
Canadian diarists 
20th-century Canadian painters 
Canadian male painters 
21st-century Canadian painters 
Artists from Montreal 
Canadian war artists 
École des beaux-arts de Montréal alumni 
20th-century Canadian male artists 
21st-century Canadian male artists